The family Cranchiidae comprises the approximately 60 species of glass squid, also known as cockatoo squid, cranchiid, cranch squid, or bathyscaphoid squid. Cranchiid squid occur in surface and midwater depths of open oceans around the world. The common name, glass squid, derives from the transparent nature of most species. Cranchiid squid spend much of their lives in partially sunlit shallow waters, where their transparency provides camouflage. They are characterised by a swollen body and short arms, which bear two rows of suckers or hooks. The third arm pair is often enlarged. Many species are bioluminescent organisms and possess light organs on the undersides of their eyes, used to cancel their shadows. Eye morphology varies widely, ranging from large and circular to telescopic and stalked. A large, fluid-filled chamber containing ammonia solution is used to aid buoyancy. This buoyancy system is unique to the family and is the source of their common name "bathyscaphoid squid", after their resemblance to a bathyscaphe. Often the only organ that is visible through the transparent tissues is a cigar-shaped digestive gland, which is the cephalopod equivalent of a mammalian liver. This is usually held in a vertical position to reduce its silhouette and a light organ is sometimes present on the lower tip to further minimise its appearance in the water.

Like most squid, the juveniles of cranchiid squid live in surface waters, descending to deeper waters as they mature. Some species live over 2 km below sea level. The body shape of many species changes drastically between growth stages, and many young examples could be confused for different species altogether.

The largest squid in the family Cranchiidae is the colossal squid.

Cranchiid squid represent no interest to commercial fisheries.

The family is named for John Cranch.

Genera
The family contains two subfamilies (both established by Georg Johann Pfeffer) and about 15 genera:
Subfamily Cranchiinae
Genus Cranchia
Genus Leachia
Genus Liocranchia
Subfamily Taoniinae
Genus Bathothauma
Genus Belonella
Genus Egea
Genus Galiteuthis
Genus Helicocranchia
Genus Liguriella
Genus Megalocranchia
Genus Mesonychoteuthis
Genus Sandalops
Genus Taonius
Genus Teuthowenia

The genus listed above with an asterisk (*) is questionable and needs further study to determine if it is a valid genus or a synonym.

References

External links

Squid